Eastland Shopping Centre is a super-regional shopping centre located in the eastern Melbourne suburb of Ringwood, Victoria, Australia, which first opened on 31 October 1967.

It is adjacent to Ringwood railway station on Maroondah Highway and serviced by several bus routes. The centre features two main levels of shops, with a third level containing a Hoyts 12-screen cinema complex and restaurants, forming a total of approximately 530 stores. Eastland also contains a library, 120 room hotel and large outdoor dining precinct called Ringwood Town Square. It is the largest shopping centre in the City of Maroondah and is located in relatively close proximity to Westfield Doncaster and Westfield Knox.

History
Construction commenced on the two-level enclosed complex in July 1966, with a  Myer and a  Safeway supermarket and variety store as major anchors, along with 40 speciality stores and a 1200 space car park. The initial centre cost $13,000,000 (1966) ($167,568,115.94 (2017)) to construct, on a  parcel of land just north of the Maroondah Highway in the heart of Ringwood.

In 1993 a massive redevelopment of the centre was announced, which involved the demolition of the existing centre in its entirety except for the 4-storey Myer building (which was simply refurbished), and after a series of three staged openings culminated in the relaunch of a new look Eastland in May, 1995.

In 1996 the Queensland Investment Corporation (QIC) purchased the centre from Coles Myer.

Stage 4 Expansion
In early 2001, after years of rumours and consumer desire for cinemas in Ringwood, QIC announced plans for a stage 4 expansion.

Big W and Bi-Lo opened in late October 2002, along with a handful of the 50 specialty stores. The cinemas opened on 26 December 2002.

Eastland Expansion 2015-2016 (Stage 5)
Expansion rumours persisted for years, with initial plans including a large 3-level expansion, connecting the Hoyts end with Maroondah Highway, providing a new entrance to the 3rd level of Myer, and culminating in an outdoor alfresco dining and nightlife area, similar to Knox Ozone. Also included in the plans were an open town centre area and a new public library and office and hotel towers. This development was originally due to get underway in late 2009, but stalled due to the Global Financial Crisis until 2013. Enabling works commenced in 2012 allowing for changes to be made to the Eastern Multilevel carpark; the entry ramp to the 3rd level of the carpark was moved, and Kmart Tyre & Auto Service was relocated to the North-Western carpark off Ringwood Street. This work was considered necessary before any redevelopment could commence.

QIC publicly unveiled the $665 million Stage 5 redevelopment on 28 October 2013.

The new expansion included a Target discount department store and a David Jones department store. The new David Jones store is the latest of the retailer's "Next Generation Store" concepts - featuring increased space for fashion and cosmetics, with less space for homewares and no space for electronics. (The old Target opposite Costco is now a Bunnings Warehouse, although its property is, too, anchored by a Coles.)

The expansion spans two levels for the most part, creating new south and east malls, with an outdoor alfresco dining and entertainment area surrounding the new Ringwood Town Centre and public library space on the third/ground level. The expansion has a focus (after customer feedback on the existing mix) on creating more dining and entertainment options for the people of Ringwood, as well as introducing more high-end fashion options into the centre.
QIC appointed Seventh Wave as Creative Directors for Stage 5 to oversee the expansion. The Realm Library, Town Square, David Jones and the Shard were designed by ACME, the Central Mall refurbishment and link malls were designed by Universal Design Studios and the East Mall was designed by Softroom.  The redevelopment completed in two stages, the first stage opened on 29 October 2015 and the second stage opened on 5 May 2016.

QIC also owns the adjacent Ringwood Market site - which was demolished at the end of 2009 to make way for a new retail/commercial development - and past plans for a westward expansion of three separate five-storey buildings, including office space, underground parking, and boutique shops/dining along with the space for a  retail store (Costco, IKEA and Masters Home Improvement were all rumoured to be vying for the space), linked to Eastland were suggested. Since then, Melbourne's second Costco Australia store was rumoured and then confirmed, with construction commencing in August 2012. The  store was opened on 20 November 2013.

Tenants 
Major retailers include David Jones, Myer, H&M, Uniqlo, Target, Kmart, Big W, Harris Scarfe, Cotton On, Woolworths, Coles, Rebel Sport, and JB Hi-Fi.

References

External links

QIC
Project Site ACME
video animation
Project description (Eastland)

Shopping centres in Melbourne
Shopping malls established in 1967
1967 establishments in Australia
Ringwood, Victoria
Buildings and structures in the City of Maroondah